This is a list of the schools in Santa Cruz County, California.

Current public schools

Current private schools

Former schools

References
 List of schools, Santa Cruz County Office of Education.  Accessed on 16 October 2012.
 List of schools, Central Coast Independent Schools.  Accessed on 08 November 2012.
 Koch, Margaret, ed.  Going to School in Santa Cruz County: A History of the County's Public School System.  Santa Cruz County Office of Education.  Fall, 1978.

Santa Cruz County